Harbhajan Singh Mann (born 30 December 1965) is an Indian-Canadian singer, actor and film producer associated with Punjabi music and cinema. His movies include Jee Aayan Nu (2002), Asa Nu Maan Watna Da (2004), Heer Ranjha (2009) and Jag Jeondeyan De Mele (2009).

Career
Mann was born in the Khemuana village, located in the Bathinda district of Punjab, India. He is of Sikh origin. Mann began singing as an amateur in 1980, and performed in local shows for the South Asian community while attending high school in Canada. His beginnings as a professional artist can be traced to 1992, while he was in Punjab. Mann realized that the market for Punjabi music in Canada was small, and he returned to Punjab to record his albums.

Mann had a breakthrough in 1999, when exposure provided by India MTV and T-Series for his Oye Hoye album. His was a Punjabi-pop style and he soon undertook playback singing roles.

The playback work led to acting roles and Mann has become a prominent figure in the revitalisation of Punjabi cinema. He has starred and produced in seven movies – Ji Aayan Nu, Asa Nu Mann Watna Da, Dil Apna Punjabi, Mitti Wajaan Mardi, Mera Pind-My home, Jag Jeondiyan De Mele and his most recent movie, Heer Ranjha.

On 2 January 2013, he released Satrangi Peengh 2, in collaboration with his brother, Gursewak Mann. Harbhajan Mann said that he wants to create music that will live for decades.

In 2013, Mann acted in Hanni, which was directed by Amitoj Maan. The two collaborated again in Gaddar – The Traitor, which was released on 29 May 2015.

Harbhajan Mann released his single "Delhi '84" in 2014, for which the music has been given by Sukshinder Shinda.

Discography

Religious

Guest appearances

Filmography

References

External links

Official website

Living people
Punjabi people
Indian Sikhs
Indian emigrants to Canada
Canadian people of Indian descent
Canadian people of Punjabi descent
Canadian Sikhs
Canadian musicians of Indian descent
Punjabi-language singers
Male actors in Punjabi cinema
People from Bathinda
1965 births
Bhangra (music) musicians